Andrey Andreyevich Markov (14 June 1856 – 20 July 1922) was a Russian mathematician best known for his work on stochastic processes. A primary subject of his research later became known as the Markov chain.

Markov and his younger brother Vladimir Andreevich Markov (1871–1897) proved the Markov brothers' inequality.
His son, another Andrey Andreyevich Markov (1903–1979), was also a notable mathematician, making contributions to constructive mathematics and recursive function theory.

Biography 
Andrey Markov was born on 14 June 1856 in Russia. He attended the St. Petersburg Grammar School, where some teachers saw him as a rebellious student. In his academics he performed poorly in most subjects other than mathematics.  Later in life he attended Saint Petersburg Imperial University (now Saint Petersburg State University). Among his teachers were Yulian Sokhotski (differential calculus, higher algebra), Konstantin Posse (analytic geometry), Yegor Zolotarev (integral calculus), Pafnuty Chebyshev (number theory and probability theory), Aleksandr Korkin (ordinary and partial differential equations), Mikhail Okatov (mechanism theory), Osip Somov (mechanics), and Nikolai Budajev (descriptive and higher geometry).  He completed his studies at the university and was later asked if he would like to stay and have a career as a Mathematician. He later taught at high schools and continued his own mathematical studies. In this time he found a practical use for his mathematical skills. He figured out that he could use chains to model the alliteration of vowels and consonants in Russian literature. He also contributed to many other mathematical aspects in his time. He died at age 66 on 20 July 1922.

Timeline 
In 1877, Markov was awarded a gold medal for his outstanding solution of the problem

About Integration of Differential Equations by Continued Fractions with an Application to the Equation .

During the following year, he passed the candidate's examinations, and he remained at the university to prepare for a lecturer's position.

In April 1880, Markov defended his master's thesis "On the Binary Square Forms with Positive Determinant", which was directed by Aleksandr Korkin and Yegor Zolotarev. Four years later in 1884, he defended his doctoral thesis titled "On Certain Applications of the Algebraic Continuous Fractions".

His pedagogical work began after the defense of his master's thesis in autumn 1880. As a privatdozent he lectured on differential and integral calculus. Later he lectured alternately on "introduction to analysis", probability theory (succeeding Chebyshev, who had left the university in 1882) and the calculus of differences. From 1895 through 1905 he also lectured in differential calculus.

One year after the defense of his doctoral thesis, Markov was appointed extraordinary professor (1886) and in the same year he was elected adjunct to the Academy of Sciences. In 1890, after the death of Viktor Bunyakovsky, Markov became an extraordinary member of the academy. His promotion to an ordinary professor of St. Petersburg University followed in the fall of 1894.

In 1896, Markov was elected an ordinary member of the academy as the successor of Chebyshev. In 1905, he was appointed merited professor and was granted the right to retire, which he did immediately. Until 1910, however, he continued to lecture in the calculus of differences.

In connection with student riots in 1908, professors and lecturers of St. Petersburg University were ordered to monitor their students. Markov refused to accept this decree, and he wrote an explanation in which he declined to be an "agent of the governance". Markov was removed from further teaching duties at St. Petersburg University, and hence he decided to retire from the university.

Markov was an atheist. In 1912, he responded to Leo Tolstoy's excommunication from the Russian Orthodox Church by requesting his own excommunication. The Church complied with his request.

In 1913, the council of St. Petersburg elected nine scientists honorary members of the university. Markov was among them, but his election was not affirmed by the minister of education. The affirmation only occurred four years later, after the February Revolution in 1917. Markov then resumed his teaching activities and lectured on probability theory and the calculus of differences until his death in 1922.

See also 

 List of things named after Andrey Markov
 Chebyshev–Markov–Stieltjes inequalities
 Gauss–Markov theorem
 Gauss–Markov process
 Hidden Markov model
 Markov blanket
 Markov chain
 Markov decision process
 Markov's inequality
 Markov brothers' inequality
 Markov information source
 Markov network
 Markov number
 Markov property
 Markov process
 Stochastic matrix (also known as Markov matrix)
 Subjunctive possibility

Notes

References

Further reading 
 
 А. А. Марков. "Распространение закона больших чисел на величины, зависящие друг от друга". "Известия Физико-математического общества при Казанском университете", 2-я серия, том 15, с. 135–156, 1906.
 A. A. Markov.  "Extension of the limit theorems of probability theory to a sum of variables connected in a chain". reprinted in Appendix B of: R. Howard.  Dynamic Probabilistic Systems, volume 1: Markov Chains. John Wiley and Sons, 1971.

External links 

 
 

Markov, Andrei Andreyevich
Markov, Andrei Andreyevich
19th-century mathematicians from the Russian Empire
20th-century Russian mathematicians
Russian atheists
Former Russian Orthodox Christians
Probability theorists
Saint Petersburg State University alumni
Full members of the Saint Petersburg Academy of Sciences
Full Members of the Russian Academy of Sciences (1917–1925)
People from Ryazan
Russian statisticians